Kumamoto, Japan, held a mayoral election on November 12, 2006.

Sources 
 Japan-election coverage
 ザ･選挙　-選挙情報-

Kumamoto
2006 elections in Japan
Mayoral elections in Japan